The Messerschmitt Bf 108 Taifun (English: "Typhoon") was a German single-engine sport and touring aircraft, developed by Bayerische Flugzeugwerke in the 1930s. The Bf 108 was of all-metal construction.

Design and development
Originally designated the M 37, the aircraft was designed as a four-seat sports/recreation aircraft for competition in the 4th Challenge International de Tourisme (1934). The M 37 prototype flew first in spring 1934, powered by a 250 PS (247 hp, 184 kW) Hirth HM 8U 8.0 litre displacement, air-cooled inverted-V8 engine, which drove a three-blade propeller.

Although it was outperformed by several other aircraft in the competition, the M 37's overall performance marked it as a popular choice for record flights. Particular among these traits was its low fuel consumption rate, good handling, and superb takeoff and landing characteristics.

The Bf 108A first flew in 1934, followed by the Bf 108B in 1935. The Bf 108B used the substantially larger, 12.67 litre displacement Argus As 10 air-cooled inverted V8 engine. The nickname Taifun (German for "typhoon") was given to her own aircraft by Elly Beinhorn, a well-known German pilot, and was generally adopted.

Operational history
Soon after the first production aircraft began to roll off the assembly line in Augsburg, several Bf 108s had set endurance records.

The Bf 108 was adopted into Luftwaffe service during World War II, where it was primarily used as a personnel transport and liaison aircraft. The aircraft involved in the Mechelen Incident was a Bf 108.

Production of the Bf 108 was transferred to occupied France during World War II and production continued after the war as the Nord 1000 Pingouin.

Variants

Bf 108A
Initial version designed in 1934 for use in Challenge 1934. Six were built with the Hirth HM 8U, one other initially had a 220 PS (217 hp, 162 kW) Argus As 17B inline engine and later a 160 PS (158 hp, 118 kW) Siemens-Halske Sh 14 radial.
Bf 108B
Revised version, built from late 1935. The prototype had a Siemens-Halske Sh 14A radial, but production machines used the 240 PS (237 hp, 177 kW) Argus As 10C or the 270 PS (266 hp, 199 kW) Argus As 10E. A quadrant-shaped rather than rectangular rear window, tailwheel replacing skid, revision of shape of empennage and removal of tailplane upper bracing. 
Bf 108CProposed high-speed version, powered by a 400 PS (395 hp, 294 kW) Hirth HM 512 engine. Probably not built.
Me 208
Improved and enlarged version with a retractable tricycle landing gear. Two prototypes were built by SNCAN (Nord) in France during the war. After 1945 Nord continued its production as the Nord Noralpha.
Nord 1000 Pingouin
Bf 108 built during and after the war by SNCAN in France; followed by the Nord 1001, that had only minor variations and the Nord 1002, which used a Renault engine.
Nord 1100 Noralpha
Bf 108 derivative built after the war by SNCAN in France with tricycle landing gear and a Renault engine.

Operators

Varig

Bulgarian Air Force Six aircraft purchased, used mainly for training.

Chinese Nationalist Air Force

Air Force of the Independent State of Croatia

Czechoslovak Air Force operated this type postwar under designation K-70.

Armée de l'Air operated captured Bf 108s and postwar-built Nord 1000 aircraft.

Luftwaffe

Royal Hungarian Air Force operated seven Bf 108s from 1937 to 1945

Regia Aeronautica

Imperial Japanese Army Air Service

Manchukuo National Airways

Royal Norwegian Air Force (Postwar)

Polish Air Force operated a few captured Bf 108s postwar.

Royal Romanian Air Force

Spanish Air Force

Swiss Air Force

Soviet Air Force operated several captured Bf 108s.

Royal Air Force  operated four Bf 108s, under the designation "Messerschmitt Aldon", which were impressed from private owners on the outbreak of the war. Reportedly they were the fastest light communications aircraft the RAF had, but they were also sometimes mistaken for Bf 109s although there is no record of any fatal encounters. Postwar, 15 more captured Bf 108s flew in RAF colours until the mid 1950s.

United States Army Air Corps - in early 1939, a single Bf 108B was purchased for $14,378 and designated XC-44. It was used only by the US air attaché in Berlin. In November 1941, the aircraft was assessed as unserviceable. The airframe was seized by the Nazi government, following the commencement of hostilities, in December.

Yugoslav Royal Air Force

Specifications (Bf 108B)

See also

References

Notes

Bibliography
 Craig, James F. The Messerschmitt Bf. 109. New York: Arco Publishing Company, 1968.
 Cross, Roy and Gerald Scarborough. Messerschmitt Bf 109 Versions B-E (Classic Aircraft No. 2, Their History and How to Model Them). London: Patrick Stevens, 1972. .
 Feist, Uwe. The Fighting Me 109. London: Arms and Armour Press, 1993. .
 Grey, C.G. "Messerschmitt Bf 108." Jane's All the World's Aircraft, 1938. London: David & Charles, 1972. . 
 Hitchcock, Thomas H. Messerschmitt Bf 108 Taifun (Monogram Close-Up 5). Acton, Massachusetts: Monogram Aviation Publications, 1979. .

 Smith, J. Richard. Messerschmitt: An Aircraft Album. London: Ian Allan, 1971. .

External links

N.Z. Warbirds Association
Messerschmitt 108 to Nord 1002
Rare Aircraft – Messerschmitt Bf.108

Bf 108
1930s German civil utility aircraft
1930s German military utility aircraft
Single-engined tractor aircraft
Low-wing aircraft
World War II utility aircraft of Germany
Aircraft first flown in 1934
World War II aircraft of Switzerland